Wood House may refer to:

Jack Wood House, Judsonia, Arkansas, listed on the National Register of Historic Places (NRHP) in White County
W. L. Wood House, Morrilton, Arkansas, NRHP-listed in Conway County
Walter B. Wood House, Modesto, California, NRHP-listed in Stanislaus County
Wood–Morris–Bonfils House, Denver, Colorado, NRHP-listed in Denver County
Wood–Tellkamp House, LaMoille, Illinois,  NRHP-listed
Ernest M. Wood Office and Studio, Quincy, Illinois, NRHP-listed
John Wood Mansion, Quincy, Illinois, NRHP-listed
John Wood Farmstead, Milroy, Indiana, NRHP-listed in Rush County
William Kennison Wood House, Iowa Center, Iowa, NRHP-listed in Story County
Herman Wood Round Barn, Iowa Falls, Iowa, NRHP-listed in Franklin County
Jeremiah Wood House, Sabula, Iowa, NRHP-listed in Jackson County
Wood House (Cottonwood Falls, Kansas), NRHP-listed in Chase County
William Johnson Wood House, Hiseville, Kentucky, NRHP-listed in Barren County
Gen. George T. Wood House, Munfordville, Kentucky, NRHP-listed in Hart County
J. A. Wood House, Cambridge, Massachusetts, NRHP-listed
Charles Wood House, Stoneham, Massachusetts, NRHP-listed
Nathan Wood House, Westminster, Massachusetts, NRHP-listed
Ahijah Wood House, Westminster, Massachusetts, NRHP-listed
Ezra Wood–Levi Warner Place, Westminster, Massachusetts, NRHP-listed
Wood Home for Boys, Mathiston, Mississippi, NRHP-listed in Webster County
Wood House (Dublin, New Hampshire), NRHP-listed in Cheshire County
Dr. Granville Wood House, Mimbres, New Mexico, NRHP-listed in Grant County
Harry Wood House, Huntington, New York, NRHP-listed in Suffolk County
William Wooden Wood House, Huntington, New York, NRHP-listed in Suffolk County
John Wood House (Huntington Station, New York), NRHP-listed in Suffolk County
Wilford Wood House, Mountainville, New York, NRHP-listed in Orange County
Amos Wood House, North Landing, New York, NRHP-listed in Jefferson County
Jethro Wood House, Poplar Ridge, New York, a National Historic Landmark and NRHP-listed in Cayuga County
Joseph Wood House, Sayville, New York, NRHP-listed in Suffolk County
Dempsey Wood House, Kinston, North Carolina, NRHP-listed in Lenoir County
Wood Old Homestead, Rio Grande, Ohio, NRHP-listed in Gallia County
Arad Wood House, Cranston, Rhode Island, NRHP-listed in Providence County
Andy Wood Log House and Willie Wood Blacksmith Shop, Georgetown, Tennessee, NRHP-listed in Meigs County
John Howland Wood House, Bayside, Texas, NRHP-listed in Refugio County
Wood–Hughes House, Brenham, Texas, NRHP-listed in Washington County
George H. Wood House, Cedar City, Utah, NRHP-listed in Iron County
Wood–Harrison House, Springville, Utah, NRHP-listed in Utah County
Wood Hall (Callaghan, Virginia), Callaghan, Virginia, NRHP-listed in Alleghany County
Judge Henry Wood Jr. House, Clarksville, NRHP-listed in Mecklenburg County
J. W. Wood Building, Lynchburg, Virginia, NRHP-listed
Theodore Wood House, Marshfield, Vermont, NRHP-listed in Washington County
Col. Henry Hewitt Wood House, Charleston, West Virginia, NRHP-listed

See also
Woods House (disambiguation)